William N. Schoenfeld (December 6, 1915 – August 3, 1996) was an American psychologist and author.

Born in New York City, he conducted original research in experimental psychology, and advocated behaviorism, which seeks to understand behavior as a function of environmental histories of experiencing consequences. Dr. Schoenfeld's own original contributions in a long research career were influenced by those of B.F. Skinner and Ivan Pavlov. In a carefully devised set of experiments in 1953 he led a team of Columbia University psychologists in discovering that anxiety caused the human heart rate to slow rather than quicken under certain timing of stimuli.

He was the co-author with Fred S. Keller, a Columbia colleague, of Principles of Psychology, an influential college text published in 1950 that emphasized scientific methods in the study of psychology. Students first used it in courses at Columbia College, where the two professors offered two hours of lecture and, for the first time in psychology, four hours of laboratory work a week. Among their experiments, the students observed the responses of white rats to stimuli and rewards and measured human learning by testing people's ability to remember the pathways of mazes and other sensory processes.<ref>Root, Michael J.  "Keller, Fred S." In Carnes, Mark C., ed. (2005). [https://books.google.com/books?id=wZczV8ZxgL4C&pg=PA306 American National Biography: Supplement 2], p. 306. Oxford University Press.</ref>

William Nathan Schoenfeld graduated from the College of the City of New York in 1937 and earned the Ph.D. at Columbia in 1942. He became a lecturer in psychology at Columbia that year, an instructor in 1946, associate professor in 1952 and full professor in 1958. He joined the faculty of Queens College of the City University of New York in 1966, became chairman of the psychology department and was named a professor emeritus in 1983. Later he taught in the psychology department of the Hebrew University in Jerusalem and at universities in Mexico, Venezuela and Brasil. He was awarded an honorary degree by the University of Guadalajara in Mexico.

Among his books were: The Theory of Reinforcement Schedules (1970), Stimulus Schedules (1972) and Religion and Human Behavior (1993).

He was president of the division of the analysis of behavior of the American Psychological Association and president of the Eastern Psychological Association (1972–1973) and the Pavlovian Society of North America. He was an editor of the Journal of Comparative and Physiological Psychology, the Journal of the Experimental Analysis of Behavior and Conditional Reflex''.

Students

William N. Schoenfeld was a prolific doctoral advisor, who is said to have ultimately valued his teaching more than his research. Indeed, many of his students continued into prominence in their own right. They include:

P. J. Bersh, A. Charles Catania, W. W. Cumming, James A. Dinsmoor, Charles Ferster, Peter Harzem, Eliot S. Hearst, Francis Mechner, John Anthony Nevin, Ovide F. Pomerleau, Emilio Ribes, Murray Sidman, Carlos Bruner.

References

External links
Columbia University
New York Times obituary

1915 births
1996 deaths
20th-century American psychologists
Behaviourist psychologists
Columbia University faculty
City College of New York alumni
Columbia University alumni
City University of New York faculty